The 2022 Connecticut State Treasurer election took place on November 8, 2022, to elect the next Connecticut State Treasurer. Incumbent Democratic Party Treasurer Shawn Wooden did not seek re-election.

Democratic primary

Candidates

Nominee
Erick Russell, former vice chair of the Democratic Party of Connecticut

Eliminated in primary
Dita Bhargava, COO of Catalan Investments and candidate for treasurer in 2018
Karen DuBois-Walton, chief executive of the New Haven Housing Authority and chair of the Connecticut State Board of Education

Declined
Arunan Arulampalam, lawyer and candidate for treasurer in 2018 (endorsed Russell)
Adam Cloud, Hartford city treasurer (endorsed Dubois-Walton)
Rodney Butler, chair of the Mashantucket Pequot Tribal Nation
Shawn Wooden, incumbent state treasurer

Endorsements

Results

Republican primary

Candidates

Nominee
Harry Arora, state representative from the 151st district (2020–) and Republican nominee for Connecticut's 4th congressional district in 2018

General election

Results

Notes

References

External links
Official campaign websites
Harry Arora (R) for Treasurer
Dita Bhargava (D) for Treasurer
Karen Dubois-Walton (D) for Treasurer
Erick Russell (D) for Treasurer

State Treasurer
Connecticut
Connecticut State Treasurer elections